Adorable Creatures is a 1952 romantic comedy film directed by Christian-Jaque. A French-Italian co-production, it stars Daniel Gélin, Antonella Lualdi, Danielle Darrieux and Martine Carol. It was shot at the Billancourt Studios in Paris. The film's sets were designed by the art director Robert Gys.

Synopsis 
André, an unmarried commercial artist in Paris, has a lot of free time which he devotes to pursuing older women, not being interested in the lively Catherine, a schoolgirl in the next apartment. His lover Christiane wants to be free of her dull husband Jacques, but when she does leave him does not then want to be encumbered by André. He meets the glamorous Minouche, who wants to leave her boring lover Georges and go on a skiing holiday. There she meets the rich Gaston and drops André, who is briefly consoled by Évelyne, Gaston's discarded mistress. Returning to Paris he is scooped up by the even older Denise, a rich and beautiful widow, but excites her jealousy by befriending her young secretary Alice. 

Back in his apartment on his own, one night his neighbours beg him to retrieve Catherine, who has run off to a country hotel with a boy named Bob. Driving there, he sends Bob packing and goes up to Catherine's bedroom. After wrecking the room in a fight, they end up on the bed together. She says she has always loved him and they agree to get married immediately. A voice-over says this is not the end of André's troubles, as he might think, but the beginning.

Cast
Daniel Gélin as André Noblet
Antonella Lualdi as Catherine Michaud
Danielle Darrieux as Christine
Martine Carol as Minouche
Edwige Feuillère as Denise Aubusson
Renée Faure as Alice
Georges Chamarat as Edmond, Catherine's Father
Daniel Lecourtois as Jacques
Marilyn Buferd as Evelyne
Jean-Marc Tennberg	as Pianist
France Roche as Françoise
Giovanna Galletti as Director
Georges Tourreil as Étienne
Raphaël Patorni as Man
Robert Rollis as Bob
Judith Magre as Jenny

References

Bibliography

External links 
 

1952 films
1952 romantic comedy films
Films directed by Christian-Jaque
French romantic comedy films
Italian romantic comedy films
French black-and-white films
Italian black-and-white films
1950s French-language films
1950s French films
1950s Italian films
Films shot at Billancourt Studios
Films set in Paris